"I Don't Want to See You Again" is a song by Paul McCartney credited to Lennon–McCartney, that was released by Peter and Gordon in 1964 as a single.  It failed to chart in the UK, but reached #16 on the Billboard Hot 100.

References

1964 singles
Songs written by Lennon–McCartney
Peter and Gordon songs
Columbia Graphophone Company singles
Capitol Records singles
1964 songs

Song recordings produced by John Burgess